Jeffrey Donald McDill (March 16, 1956 – November 3, 2012) was a Canadian professional ice hockey right winger who played in one National Hockey League game for the Chicago Black Hawks during the 1976–77 season, on March 12, 1977 against the Montreal Canadiens. The rest of his career, which lasted from 1976 to 1980, was spent in the minor leagues. He died aged 56 on November 3, 2012. McDill was born in Thunder Bay, Ontario.

Career statistics

Regular season and playoffs

See also
 List of players who played only one game in the NHL

References

External links
 

1956 births
2012 deaths
Canadian ice hockey right wingers
Chicago Blackhawks draft picks
Chicago Blackhawks players
Cleveland Crusaders draft picks
Dallas Black Hawks players
Dauphin Kings players
Flin Flon Bombers players
Flint Generals players
Ice hockey people from Ontario
Kalamazoo Wings (1974–2000) players
Maine Mariners players
Muskegon Mohawks players
New Haven Nighthawks players
Sportspeople from Thunder Bay
Victoria Cougars (WHL) players